The Marxist Tendency (MT) is a Trotskyist organization in Russia, created in May 2019 as a result of the merger of the Russian section of the International Marxist Tendency with a faction of the Revolutionary Workers' Party. According to its own statements, the MT is a communist organization that is "working to create national sections of the IMT in the territory of the former USSR."

The movement participated in the 2021 protests and the 2022 anti-war protests, and also condemned the intervention of the CSTO forces in protest-ridden Kazakhstan.

References

2019 establishments in Russia
Communist parties in Russia
Far-left political parties
Far-left politics in Russia
International Marxist Tendency
Political organizations based in Russia
Political parties established in 2019
Trotskyist organizations in Russia